Ben Hannigan (3 September 1943 – 4 February 2021) was an Irish footballer who played as an inside forward. He spent most of his career playing for Shelbourne in the League of Ireland.

Career
Hannigan had three different spells with Shelbourne as a player from 1961–66, 1972–74, and finally in the 1980–81 season.

His first spell was the most successful as Shels won the league championship in 1962 after defeating Cork Celtic in a play-off and then defeating Cork Hibernians in the following year's FAI Cup final.

In December 1965 he signed for Wrexham but was soon back home with Dundalk where he won the League in 1967. He scored over 50 goals for the Oriel Park side.

Hannigan then signed for Shamrock Rovers in April 1969 and made his debut on 6 April. He won the FAI Cup in his first season and represented Rovers twice in European competition against Schalke 04. In Finn Harps' first ever game in the League of Ireland Hannigan scored four times in a 10–2 win on 17 August 1969.

Hannigan later signed for Sligo Rovers in February 1971. He scored on his debut on 28 February. In his time at the Showgrounds he played a total of six games scoring once. This was followed by a short spell at Fortuna Köln in the early stages of the 1971–72 season but unlike Noel Campbell, whom Fortuna had signed simultaneously, Hannigan went back home soon.

Death
Hannigan died on 4 February 2021, aged 77.

Honours
Shelbourne
 League of Ireland: 1961–62
 FAI Cup: 1963

Dundalk
 League of Ireland: 1966–67
 Dublin City Cup: 1968

Cork Celtic
 League of Ireland: 1973–74

Shamrock Rovers
 FAI Cup: 1969

References

1943 births
2021 deaths
League of Ireland players
Shelbourne F.C. players
Dundalk F.C. players
Shamrock Rovers F.C. players
Sligo Rovers F.C. players
St Patrick's Athletic F.C. players
Wrexham A.F.C. players
SC Fortuna Köln players
League of Ireland XI players
Association football inside forwards
Republic of Ireland association footballers
Chelmsford City F.C. players